Andrea Arlati (born 7 May 1970) is a former Italian male long-distance runner who competed at three editions of the IAAF World Cross Country Championships at senior level (1994, 1995, 1999) and one of the IAAF World Half Marathon Championships (1995).

References

External links
 

1970 births
Living people
Italian male long-distance runners
Italian male cross country runners